An upholstery regulator is an upholstery tool which smooths irregularities in the stuffing beneath the coverings. 

Whilst it looks similar to a needle it is heavier; like needles the regulator comes in various gauges and lengths. It is used to poke through the various layers to adjust the stuffing before the final cover is put in place. 

A related tool is the stuffing iron, which is used to push the stuffing into the curves and corners of a piece of furniture; it has a narrow piece of steel with one toothed edge to grab loose stuffing and place it in the hard to reach spots.

See also
 (image-heavy)

References 
 

Tools
Tools, Regulator